The Source Presents: Hip Hop Hits, Volume 9 is the ninth annual music compilation album to be contributed by The Source magazine.  Released December 7, 2004, and distributed by Image Entertainment, Hip Hop Hits Volume 9 features sixteen hip hop and rap hits (one of them being the bonus track).  It went to number 36 on the Top R&B/Hip Hop Albums chart and number 75 on the Billboard 200 album chart.  It is also one of only two Hip Hop Hits albums to be released in the same year; Volume 8 was released six months earlier.

Two songs peaked number one on the Hot Rap Tracks chart:  Overnight Celebrity and Slow Motion (which was a number one pop hit).  It is the sixth compilation not to feature a number-one R&B/Hip Hop hit.

Track listing
Game Over - Lil' Flip
Locked Up - Akon
Slow Motion - Juvenile and Soulja Slim
Blow It Out - Ludacris
Welcome Back - Mase
Freek-A-Leek - Petey Pablo
I Like That - Chingy, Nate Dogg and Houston
No Better Love - Rell and Young Gunz
Overnight Celebrity - Twista
Selfish - John Legend, Slum Village and Kanye West
Got It Twisted - Mobb Deep
Bottles & Up - Benzino
No Problem - Lil' Scrappy
Bring It Back - Mannie Fresh and Lil' Wayne
Rubberband Man - T.I.
Don't Hate - Benzino and Faheim

References

Hip hop compilation albums
2004 compilation albums
Image Entertainment compilation albums